Henry Cunningham (c. 1678–1736) was a Scottish Whig politician.

Henry Cunningham (knight), Scottish noble
H. S. Cunningham, British lawyer and writer
Henry Cunningam, Irish Anglican priest